The 1985 Alan King Classic was a men's tennis tournament played on outdoor hard courts at Caesars Palace in Las Vegas, United States. It was the 13th and last edition of the event and was part of the 1985 Nabisco Grand Prix circuit. The tournament was held from April 29 through May 5, 1985. Unseeded Johan Kriek won the singles title.

Finals

Singles
 Johan Kriek defeated  Jimmy Arias 4–6, 6–4, 6–3, 6–2
 It was Kriek's only singles title of the year and the 13th of his career.

Doubles
 Pat Cash /  John Fitzgerald defeated  Paul Annacone /  Christo van Rensburg 7–6, 6–7, 7–6

References

External links
 ITF tournament edition details

Alan King Tennis Classic
Alan King Tennis Classic
Alan King Tennis Classic
Tennis in Las Vegas
Alan King Tennis Classic
Alan King Tennis Classic
Alan King Tennis Classic